Tyrosine-protein phosphatase non-receptor type 6, also known as Src homology region 2 domain-containing phosphatase-1 (SHP-1), is an enzyme that in humans is encoded by the PTPN6 gene.

Function 

The protein encoded by this gene is a member of the protein tyrosine phosphatase (PTP) family. PTPs are known to be signaling molecules that regulate a variety of cellular processes including cell growth, differentiation, mitotic cycle, and oncogenic transformation. N-terminal part of this PTP contains two tandem Src homolog (SH2) domains, which act as protein phospho-tyrosine binding domains, and mediate the interaction of this PTP with its substrates. This PTP is expressed primarily in hematopoietic cells, and functions as an important regulator of multiple signaling pathways in hematopoietic cells. This PTP has been shown to interact with, and dephosphorylate a wide spectrum of phospho-proteins involved in hematopoietic cell signaling, (e.g., the LYN-CD22-SHP-1 pathway). Multiple alternatively spliced variants of this gene, which encode distinct isoforms, have been reported.

Expression 

SHP-1 gene has two promoters: P-1, active in epithelial cells, and P-2, active in hemopoietic cells. In addition the expression of SHP-1 is low in epithelial cells and high in hemopoietic cells. SHP-1 level in epithelial cells increases and in hematopoietic cells decreases in cancer.

Interactions 

PTPN6 has been shown to interact with:

 BCR gene, 
 CD117, 
 CD22, 
 CD31, 
 CTNND1, 
 EGFR, 
 EPOR, 
 FCRL3, 
 Grb2, 
 HOXA10, 
 JAK2, 
 LAIR1, 
 LILRB2, 
 LILRB4,
 Lck, 
 LCP2, 
 PRKCD, 
 PTK2B, 
 ROS1, 
 SIRPA, 
 SYK,  and
 TYK2.

References